Homalium tomentosum is a species of flowering plant in the family Salicaceae. It is found in Southeast and South Asia.

References

tomentosum
Trees of Indo-China